Grabki Duże  is a village in the administrative district of Gmina Szydłów, within Staszów County, Świętokrzyskie Voivodeship, in south-central Poland.

The village has a population of  375.

In a village there is a baroque palace from 1742, designed in oriental style by Franciszek Placidi. It was built by a noble Stanisław Rupniewski, who spent some time in a Turkish captivity and converted himself to Islam. The palace was nicknamed "harem" by the neighbors. The palace is in private hands and can be viewed from the outside.

Demography 
According to the 2002 Poland census, there were 387 people residing in Grabki Duże village, of whom 49.4% were male and 50.6% were female. In the village, the population was spread out, with 25.1% under the age of 18, 36.2% from 18 to 44, 19.4% from 45 to 64, and 19.4% who were 65 years of age or older.
 Figure 1. Population pyramid of village in 2002 – by age group and sex

References

Villages in Staszów County
Palaces in Poland